The Fairfield City Council is a local government area in the west of Sydney, in the state of New South Wales, Australia. The council was first incorporated as the "Municipal District of Smithfield and Fairfield" on 8 December 1888, and the council's name was changed to the "Municipality of Fairfield" in 1920, before being proclaimed a city in 1979. The Mayor of the City of Fairfield is Cr. Frank Carbone, the first popularly-elected independent mayor of Fairfield.

Fairfield is considered one of the most ethnically diverse suburbs in Australia. At the 2016 census, the proportion of residents in the Fairfield local government area who stated their ancestry as Vietnamese and Assyrian, was in excess of sixteen times the national average. The area was linguistically diverse, with Vietnamese, Arabic, Assyrian Neo-Aramaic, or Cantonese languages spoken in households, and ranged from two times to seventeen times the national averages.

The Smithfield–Wetherill Park Industrial Estate is the largest industrial estate in the Southern Hemisphere and is the centre of manufacturing and distribution in GWS, with more than 1,000 manufacturing, wholesale, transport and service firms.

Geography
A few small areas of the original bushland remain, including examples of Cumberland Plain Woodland, which is listed under the Threatened Species Conservation Act, and the Cooks River/Castlereagh Ironbark ecological community. There are 580 parks (60 of which are major parks), including one of the largest urban parks in the world, Western Sydney Parklands, which has a precinct that lies in the Fairfield area, called the Western Sydney Regional Park. Fairfield City is mainly residential in nature with large-scale industrial estates at Wetherill Park and Smithfield. Fairfield Showground is an important cultural venue. Prominent roads such as Cumberland Highway and The Horsley Drive wind through it.

Suburbs in the local government area
Suburbs in the City of Fairfield are:

History

For more than 30,000 years, Aboriginal people from the Cabrogal–Gandangara tribe have lived in the area.

One of Sydney's oldest trees, the Bland Oak, was planted in the 1830s in Carramar. European settlement began early in the 19th century and was supported by railway construction in 1856. At the turn of the century the area had a population of 2,500 people and with fertile soils, produced crops for distribution in Sydney. The council was first incorporated as the "Municipal District of Smithfield and Fairfield" on 8 December 1888, becoming the "Municipality of Smithfield and Fairfield" from 1906. On 26 October 1920, the council's name was changed to the "Municipality of Fairfield", in recognition of the changing centre of business in the council area.

Rapid population increase after World War II saw the settlement of many ex-service men and European migrants. Large scale Housing Commission development in the 1950s swelled the population to 38,000. From 1 January 1949, under the Local Government (Areas) Act 1948, the Municipality of Cabramatta and Canley Vale was amalgamated into the Municipality of Fairfield. On 18 May 1979, the Municipality of Fairfield was granted city status, becoming the "City of Fairfield".

On Friday 29 June, 2001 the former Deputy Mayor of Fairfield and councillor from 1987 to 1998, Phuong Ngo, was convicted of the 1994 murder of the local state MP for Cabramatta (and former Deputy Mayor), John Newman, a crime which has been described as Australia's first political assassination. Ngo's alleged accomplices, Quang Dao and David Dinh, were acquitted and the identity of the killer who shot and fatally wounded Newman remains a mystery. Controversy has arisen in the years since then of the presence of Ngo's name on various council plaques from his time on council.

In September 2006, Fairfield Council announced the introduction of a trial ban on spitting in public on public health grounds. However, it was reported that advice provided to council from NSW Health was that spitting does not impact on the transmission of infectious diseases. The law proved difficult to prosecute.

Heritage listings 
The City of Fairfield has a number of heritage-listed sites, including:
 Bonnyrigg, Cartwright Street: Bonnyrigg House
 Bonnyrigg, Lot 1 Cartwright Street: Male Orphan School land
 Fairfield, Great Southern railway: Fairfield railway station, Sydney
 Horsley Park, 52–58 Jamieson Close: Horsley complex
 Lansvale, Hume Highway: Lansdowne Bridge

Business and industry 

Fairfield is a centre of manufacturing and distribution for Greater Western Sydney and home to the Smithfield-Wetherill Park Industrial Estate, which is the largest industrial zone in the Southern Hemisphere. It is also home to the Yennora industrial zone, where key operators in the area include Toll, Woolworths, Linfox, Australian Wool Handlers, Qube and Hume Building Products.

Demographics
At the  there were  people in the Fairfield local government area, of these 49.3 per cent were male and 50.7 per cent were female. Aboriginal and Torres Strait Islander people made up 0.7 per cent of the population; significantly below the NSW and Australian averages of 2.9 and 2.8 per cent respectively. The median age of people in the City of Fairfield was 36 years; slightly lower than the national median of 38 years. Children aged 0 – 14 years made up 19.1 per cent of the population and people aged 65 years and over made up 13.8 per cent of the population. Of people in the area aged 15 years and over, 48.1 per cent were married and 12.4 per cent were either divorced or separated.

At the 2016 census, the population in the City increased by 5.89 per cent. When compared with total population growth of Australia for the same period, being 8.8 per cent, population growth in the Fairfield local government area was a little over half the national average.

The median weekly income for residents within the City of Fairfield was lower than the national average, being one of the factors that place the city in an area of social disadvantage.

As at the 2016 census, the influence of Vietnamese culture and language was statistically strong, evidenced by the proportion of residents with Vietnamese ancestry (nearly twenty times higher than the national average), the proportion of residents who spoke Vietnamese as either a first or second language (also nearly twenty times higher than the national average), and the proportion of residents who stated a religious affiliation with Catholicism and Buddhism (the latter being in excess of nine times the national average).

Council

Current composition and election method
Fairfield City Council is composed of twelve Councillors, including the Mayor, for a fixed four-year term of office. The Mayor has been directly elected since 2004, while the twelve other Councillors are elected proportionally to two separate wards, each electing four Councillors. The most recent election was held on 2 December 2021, and the makeup of the council, including the Mayor, is as follows:

The current Council, elected in 2021, in order of election by ward, is:

Mayors

Town Clerks/General Manager/City Managers

Sister cities
 Palmi, Italy
 Zhenjiang, China

References

External links

 
Fairfield
Fairfield
Hume Highway
Fairfield City Council
Georges River